This page details statistics of the UEFA Women's Cup and Women's Champions League.

The UEFA Women's Cup was first played in 2001–02 and was the first international women's club football tournament for UEFA member associations. In 2009–10 it was renamed and rebranded into the Women's Champions League and allowed runner-up entries from the top eight leagues. After an expansion in 2016–17 the runners-up from the top 12 associations enter. After an expansion in 2021–22 the runners-up from the top 16 associations and the third-placed teams from the top 6 associations enter. Also from the 2021–22 season, the competition proper will include a group stage for the first time in the Women's Champions League era.

General performances

By club

By nation

Number of participating clubs in the group stage

Season in Bold: Team qualified for knockout phase.

Number of participating clubs of the Champions League era

A total of 113 clubs from 38 national associations have played in or qualified for the Champions League round of 32. This table does not consider years when the tournament was branded as the UEFA Women's Cup. Season in bold are seasons teams qualified for the round of 16 (from 2021–22 knockout phase).

Team in Bold: advanced to at least the Round of 16.
Team in Italic: team no longer active. (If a successor team has also qualified, total appearances are grouped together.)

Teams: tournament position
 Most titles won 8,  Lyon (2011, 2012, 2016, 2017, 2018, 2019, 2020, 2022).
 Most finishes in the top two 10,  Lyon (2010, 2011, 2012, 2013, 2016, 2017, 2018, 2019, 2020, 2022).
 Most finishes in the top four 12,  Lyon (2008, 2009, 2010, 2011, 2012, 2013, 2016, 2017, 2018, 2019, 2020, 2022).

 Most appearances 20,  KÍ (every tournament from 2001-02 to 2017-18 and from 2020-21).

Consecutive
 Most consecutive championships 5,  Lyon (2016, 2017, 2018, 2019, 2020).
 Most consecutive finishes in the top two 5,  Lyon  (2016-2020).
 Most consecutive finishes in the top four 6,  Lyon (2008–2013).

Defending the trophy
 A total of 21 tournaments have been played, 8 in the Women's Cup era (2001–02 to 2008–09) and 13 in the Champions League era (2009–10 to 2021–22). 7 of the 18 attempts to defend the trophy (38.89%) have been successful, split between 3 teams. These are:
 Lyon on 5 attempts out of 7 (2011–12, 2016–17, 2017–18, 2018–19, 2019-20)
 Umeå on 1 attempt out of 2 (2003–04)
 Wolfsburg on 1 attempt out of 2 (2013–14)
 Between the two eras of this competition, this breaks down as:
 Of the 8 attempts in Women's Cup era: 2 successful (25.0%)
 Of the 13 attempts in the Women's Champions League era: 6 successful (54.5%)
 Two teams have managed to defend the trophy in the Champions League era:
 Wolfsburg (once), who won in 2012–13 and 2013–14
 Lyon (five times), who won in 2010–11, 2011–12, 2015–16, 2016–17, 2017–18, 2018–19 and 2019–20

Gaps
 Longest gap between successive titles 7 years,  Frankfurt (2008–2015).
 Longest gap between successive appearances in the top two 4 years,  Frankfurt (2008–2012) and  Turbine Potsdam (2006–2010).

Other
 Most finishes in the top four without ever being champion 6,  Paris Saint-Germain (2015, 2016, 2017, 2020, 2021, 2022).
 Most played final 4,  Lyon vs  Wolfsburg (2013, 2016, 2018, 2020).

Coaches: tournament position
 Most championships 2,  Hans-Jürgen Tritschoks (2006 and 2008 with Frankfurt),  Bernd Schröder (2005 and 2010 with Turbine Potsdam),  Patrice Lair (2011 and 2012 with Lyon),  Gérard Prêcheur (2016 and 2017 also with Lyon),  Reynald Pedros (2018 and 2019 also with Lyon) and  Ralf Kellermann (2013 and 2014 with Wolfsburg).
 Most finishes in the top two 4,  Bernd Schröder (2005, 2006, 2010 and 2011 with Turbine Potsdam),  Patrice Lair (2011, 2012, 2013 with Lyon and 2017 with Paris Saint-Germain)

Teams: matches played and goals scored

All time
 
 Most matches played 116,  Lyon.
 Most wins 92,  Lyon.
 Most goals scored 422,  Lyon.

Individual
 Most championships 8  Sarah Bouhaddi,  Eugénie Le Sommer and  Wendie Renard (2011, 2012, 2016, 2017, 2018, 2019, 2020, 2022 with Olympique Lyon).
 Champion with most teams 3   Conny Pohlers (2005 with Turbine Potsdam, 2008 with Frankfurt, 2013 and 2014 with Wolfsburg)

Goalscoring

All-time top scorers
 Bold players still active.

Most hattricks 

Boldface indicates a player who is currently active.

Most goals in a single season

Includes qualifying games.
Bold indicates ongoing season and active player in the season.

In finals
 Fastest goal from kickoff in a final 12 seconds,  Marta (Umeå), vs Frankfurt, 2008.
 Latest goal from kickoff in a final 93rd minute,  Birgit Prinz (Frankfurt), vs Turbine Potsdam, 2006.

Team
 Biggest margin of victory 21,  Apollon Limassol (21) vs  Ada Velipojë (0), 2012–13 qualifying round.
 Biggest margin of victory, final game 6,  Duisburg (6) vs  Zvezda Perm (0), 2009 Final.
 Most goals scored in a match, one team 21,  Apollon Limassol (21) vs  Ada Velipojë (0), 2012–13 qualifying round.
 Most goals scored in a final game, both teams 7,  Wolfsburg (4) vs  Tyresö (3), 2014 Final.

Tournament
 Most goals scored in a tournament 470 goals, 2007–08.
 Fewest goals scored in a tournament 186 goals, 2015–16.
 Most goals per match in a tournament 5.36 goals per match, 2001–02.
 Fewest goals per match in a tournament 3.05 goals per match, 2015–16.

Penalty shootouts
 Most shootouts, team, all-time 2,  Frankfurt (2003, 2016) and  Turbine Potsdam (twice in 2010).
 Most shootouts, team, in one tournament 2,  Turbine Potsdam, 2009–10.
 Most shootouts, all teams, in one tournament 2, 2009–10.
 Most wins, team, all-time 2,  Turbine Potsdam.
 Most successful kicks, team, all-time 11,  Frankfurt (in 2 shootouts).
 Most successful kicks, team, in one tournament 10,  Turbine Potsdam, 2009–10 (in 2 shootouts).
 Most successful kicks, all teams, in one tournament 17, 2009–10 (in 2 shootouts).

References

Records
Women's association football records and statistics